Clinogyne is a former genus of monocotyledonous plants, which have been moved to other genera. Its species included the following:

 C. canniformis, renamed Donax canniformis 
 C. azurea, renamed Halopegia azurea 
 C. blumei, renamed Halopegia blumei 
 C. virgata, renamed Indianthus virgatus 
 C. dichotoma (harvested for weaving into mats for use on beds and floors), Schumannianthus dichotomus
 Several species reclassified into genus Marantochloa

References 

Historically recognized angiosperm genera
Marantaceae